Amancio Amaro Varela (16 October 1939 – 21 February 2023), commonly known simply as Amancio, was a Spanish football player. Nicknamed El Brujo (The Wizard) he played outside right for Deportivo de La Coruña, Real Madrid, and the Spain national team.

Club career

Early career
Amancio began his career aged 15 at local side Victoria CF, in the district of Falperra–Santa Lucía. In the 1958–59 season, he joined Deportivo de La Coruña, which at that time was in the Spanish second division. When Deportivo were promoted to first division, Amancio started to attract the attention of the scouts for major teams, such as Real Madrid.

Real Madrid

The signing of Amancio by Real Madrid almost did not happen; had it not been for Santiago Bernabéu Yeste’s insistence in signing the player, his astronomical signing-fee would have spoiled the negotiations.

Along with the signing of Amancio by Real Madrid in June 1962, players such as Ignacio Zoco, Lucien Muller, and Yanko Daucik also arrived. During this time the team was in a transitional phase, since in earlier years the team had swept the competition both in Spain and outside its borders. Amancio made his debut in European competition opposite Anderlecht (3–3 result in the Santiago Bernabéu); and in the league against Real Betis in Seville with a 5–2 win for Real Madrid.

During the 1963–64 season, Amancio and Real Madrid reached the final of the European Cup, only to be beaten by Inter Milan by 3–1. The following season brought more heartache, with Benfica eliminating the youthful Madrid side in the quarterfinals. The ensuing season brought success for Madrid, as Miguel Muñoz added young players such as Pirri, Velázquez, Sanchís and Grosso. This was known as the "Yé-Yé" team. Strong at the back, and devastating going forward, Madrid fought their way to another final, this time against FK Partizan. The venue was Heysel Stadium in Brussels, and on 11 May 1966, Amancio stepped out on to the pitch for his second and last European Cup final. FK Partizan's Velibor Vasović scored the first goal of the match. Amancio drew level twenty minutes from the end, after collecting a signature pass, faking out a defender and skillfully booting the ball past the Yugoslav keeper Milutin Šoškić. Five minutes later, a thunderous shot by teammate Serena from 30 metres out settled the game. It was Amancio's first and only European Cup winner's medal. In his first six seasons in Madrid, he won a six La Liga titles. He would then go on to win another three. He also took the title of Pichichi on back to back occasions, 1969 and 1970.

As a Real Madrid player, Amancio's reputation reached such international fame, that he had the honour of being called for a world team, promoted by FIFA.

Amancio retired in 1976 and joined the coaching staff of Real Madrid. After the death of Francisco "Paco" Gento, he was appointed the honorary president of the club in 2022.

International career
Amancio wore the Spain national team's jersey on 42 occasions, debuting before Romania. With the team, he was a participant of one of its greatest achievements: winning the 1964 European Football Championship by a 2–1 score against the defending champions, the Soviet Union.

Managerial career
Upon retiring, Amancio began coaching the junior teams of Real Madrid. After one season, he decided to dedicate himself to his businesses. In 1982, he was readmitted by Luis de Carlos, who had just won the club's presidential elections.

Amancio once again took charge of Castilla CF, with which he won the Segunda División in his second season. The team included the legendary Quinta del Buitre, made up of Butragueño, Míchel, Sanchis, Martín Vázquez, and Pardeza.

In the 1984–85 season, Amancio took charge of the first team. However, the outcome was not as good as expected, and he left his post. After a time as a consultant, Amancio left Real Madrid to join the sports company Kelme, becoming a representative responsible for the Madrid area.

In July 2000, Amancio was elected as a member of the board of directors of Real Madrid. From this position, he favored the incorporation of former Real players in different positions of responsibility of the club. The board of directors agreed that Amancio would be in charge of the 100th anniversary of Real Madrid.

In 2022, he was appointed to the position of the honorary president of the club.

Death
Amancio died in Madrid on 21 February 2023, at the age of 83.

Career statistics

Club

International

Scores and results list Spain's goal tally first, score column indicates score after each Amancio goal.

Honours

Player
Deportivo
 Segunda División: 1961–62

Real Madrid
 Spanish League: 1962–63, 1963–64, 1964–65, 1966–67, 1967–68, 1968–69, 1971–72, 1974–75, 1975–76
 Copa del Generalísimo: 1969–70, 1973–74, 1974–75
 European Cup: 1965–66

Spain
UEFA European Football Championship: 1964

Individual
 Pichichi: 1968–69, 1969–70
 Pichichi Second Division: 1961–62
 Ballon d'Or third place: 1964
UEFA European Championship Team of the Tournament: 1964
 FIFA XI: 1968

Manager
Castilla
 Segunda División: 1983–84

References

External links

 
 
 National team data 
 
 Real Madrid archives 
 International appearances at RSSSF
 

1939 births
2023 deaths
Footballers from A Coruña
Spanish footballers
Association football midfielders
Association football forwards
Deportivo de La Coruña players
Real Madrid CF players
La Liga players
Pichichi Trophy winners
UEFA Champions League winning players
Spanish men's futsal players
Inter FS players
Spain international footballers
1964 European Nations' Cup players
1966 FIFA World Cup players
UEFA European Championship-winning players
Spanish football managers
Real Madrid CF non-playing staff
Real Madrid Castilla managers
Real Madrid CF managers
Segunda División managers
La Liga managers